Chaetocnema orientalis is a species of beetle from Chrysomelidae family.

Description
The species are gray coloured, and have orange legs and antennae. It is similar to Chaetocnema obesa.

Distribution
The species can be found in European countries like Greece, North Macedonia, and Romania. It can also be found in Central Asian locations such as Caucasus and Turkmenistan. Also it is quite common in the Middle East, in countries like Iraq, Iran, Israel, Syria and Turkey.

References

Beetles described in 1874
Alticini
Beetles of Asia
Beetles of Europe
Insects of Central Asia
Fauna of the Middle East